Four referendums were held in Switzerland in 1974. The first was held on 20 October on a popular initiative "against foreign infiltration and overpopulation", and was rejected by voters. The next three were held on 8 December on an amendment to the federal budget (rejected), restricting federal expenditure (approved) and a popular initiative (and counterproposal) on social health insurance (both of which were rejected).

Results

October: Foreign infiltration and overpopulation

December: Federal budget

December: Spending restrictions

December: Social health insurance

References

1974 referendums
1974 in Switzerland
Referendums in Switzerland